Catherine Tregenna is a Welsh playwright, television screenwriter and actress. She has written episodes for EastEnders, Casualty and for the first four series of ITV1 crime drama Law & Order: UK.

Career
Tregenna began as an actress. She played the character Kirsty McGurk, for several years, in Pobol Y Cwm and a doctor in Satellite City.

In 2001, she wrote the comedy play Art and Guff. After, she transitioned back into television as a writer, co-writing the series Cowbois ac Injans and four episodes of the BBC's science fiction drama and Doctor Who spin-off Torchwood: "Out of Time", "Captain Jack Harkness", "Meat" and "Adam". As well as writing Meat, she also created the meat props shown in the episode. "Captain Jack Harkness" was nominated for the 2008 Hugo Award for Best Dramatic Presentation, Short Form.

In November 2014, it was confirmed that she would be writing an episode for the ninth series of Doctor Who, "The Woman Who Lived". She contributed episodes to the third and final series of Stan Lee's Lucky Man, the third series of Riviera and the fifth episode of The Watch, which is inspired by the Ankh-Morpork City Watch from the Discworld series of fantasy novels by Terry Pratchett.

References

External links

20th-century births
21st-century British dramatists and playwrights
21st-century British screenwriters
21st-century Welsh women writers
21st-century Welsh writers
British soap opera writers
Welsh women dramatists and playwrights
Living people
Place of birth missing (living people)
Welsh dramatists and playwrights
Welsh science fiction writers
Welsh television writers
Women science fiction and fantasy writers
Women soap opera writers
Year of birth missing (living people)
British women television writers